Auburn is a town in Chippewa County in the U.S. state of Wisconsin. The population was 697 at the 2010 census, up from 580 at the 2000 census.

History
The town was named from a place called Auburn, mentioned in the poem "The Deserted Village" by Oliver Goldsmith.

Geography
The Town of Auburn is in northwestern Chippewa County and is bordered by Barron County to the north and Dunn County to the west. The village of New Auburn borders the northeast corner of the town.

Demographics

As of the census of 2000, there were 580 people, 202 households, and 163 families residing in the town. The population density was 16.2 people per square mile (6.3/km2). There were 210 housing units at an average density of 5.9 per square mile (2.3/km2). The racial makeup of the town was 98.45% White, 0.17% Native American, 0.17% from other races, and 1.21% from two or more races. Hispanic or Latino of any race were 0.17% of the population.

There were 202 households, out of which 33.7% had children under the age of 18 living with them, 73.8% were married couples living together, 3.5% had a female householder with no husband present, and 19.3% were non-families. 13.9% of all households were made up of individuals, and 5.0% had someone living alone who was 65 years of age or older. The average household size was 2.87 and the average family size was 3.19.

In the town, the population was spread out, with 27.2% under the age of 18, 8.4% from 18 to 24, 31.9% from 25 to 44, 22.6% from 45 to 64, and 9.8% who were 65 years of age or older. The median age was 34 years. For every 100 females, there were 112.5 males. For every 100 females age 18 and over, there were 112.1 males.

The median income for a household in the town was $36,000, and the median income for a family was $39,444. Males had a median income of $24,167 versus $19,063 for females. The per capita income for the town was $17,164. About 3.7% of families and 8.2% of the population were below the poverty line, including 11.9% of those under age 18 and 11.0% of those age 65 or over.

Notable people

 John E. Prince, Wisconsin State Representative, farmer, and resort owner, was born in the town

References

External links
Town of Auburn, Wisconsin - Official Website

Towns in Chippewa County, Wisconsin
Eau Claire–Chippewa Falls metropolitan area
Towns in Wisconsin